Matthew Clare (born 4 March 1997) is an English badminton player. He graduated from the Ripon Grammar School, and now educated at the Loughborough University. He won the 2016 U-19 National Junior Championships in the boys' doubles event partnered with Ben Lane. He also the member of the English junior team that won silver medal at the 2015 European Junior Championships. In 2017, he won the mixed doubles title at the Croatian International tournament with Victoria Williams, he also the third place in the men's doubles event with David King.

Achievements

BWF International Challenge/Series (2 titles, 5 runner-up) 
Men's doubles

Mixed doubles

  BWF International Challenge tournament
  BWF International Series tournament
  BWF Future Series tournament

References

External links 
 

1997 births
Living people
People from Ripon
English male badminton players
People educated at Ripon Grammar School